Sarah Schneider (born August 30, 1980) is an American mixed martial artist who competes in the Strawweight division. She is currently signed with Invicta FC.

Mixed martial arts record

|-
| Win
| align=center| 7–6
| Amber Stautzenberger
| Decision (Unanimous)
| EB - Beatdown at 4 Bears 11
| 
| align=center| 3
| align=center| 5:00
| North Dakota, United States
| 
|-
| Loss
| align=center| 6–6
| Carla Esparza
| TKO (Punches)
| Invicta FC 2
| 
| align=center| 2
| align=center| 4:28
| Kansas, United States
| 
|-
| Win
| align=center| 6–5
| Sally Krumdiack
| Submission (Armbar)
| Invicta FC 1
| 
| align=center| 1
| align=center| 3:01
| Kansas, United States
| 
|-
| Win
| align=center| 5–5
| Ivana Coleman
| Submission (Armbar)
| BEP 5 - Breast Cancer Beatdown
| 
| align=center| 1
| align=center| 4:30
| North Carolina, United States
| 
|-
| Loss
| align=center| 4–5
| Megumi Fujii
| TKO (Punches)
| Bellator 21
| 
| align=center| 1
| align=center| 3:58
| Florida, United States
| 
|-
| Loss
| align=center| 4–4
| Adrienna Jenkins
| Submission (Rear-Naked Choke)
| FCF - Freestyle Cage Fighting 39
| 
| align=center| 2
| align=center| 3:07
| Oklahoma, United States
| 
|-
| Loss
| align=center| 4–3
| Sarah Kaufman
| TKO (Punches)
| PFC: Best of Both Worlds 2
| 
| align=center| 2
| align=center| 1:43
| California, United States
| 
|-
| Win
| align=center| 4–2
| Julie Kedzie
| Submission (Rear-Naked Choke)
| MF - Matrix Fights 6
| 
| align=center| 1
| align=center| 2:01
| New Mexico, United States
| 
|-
| Loss
| align=center| 3–2
| Jennifer Tate
| Decision (Split)
| PureCombat 6 - Halloween Bash
| 
| align=center| 2
| align=center| 4:45
| Connecticut, United States
| 
|-
| Loss
| align=center| 3–1
| Tonya Evinger
| Decision (Decision)
| TFF - True Fight Fans
| 
| align=center| 3
| align=center| 5:00
| Missouri, United States
| 
|-
| Win
| align=center| 3–0
| Ashley Sanchez
| Decision (Unanimous)
| FFF 4 - Call of the Wild
| 
| align=center| 5
| align=center| 3:00
| Los Angeles, United States
| 
|-
| Win
| align=center| 2–0
| Kaitlin Young
| Submission (Armbar)
| Tuff-N-Uff - Thompson vs. Troyer
| 
| align=center| 2
| align=center| 0:35
| Las Vegas, United States
| 
|-
| Win
| align=center| 1–0
| Corinna West
| Submission (Armbar)
| TFC 9 - Summer Mayhem 2
| 
| align=center| 1
| align=center| 0:50
| Kansas, United States
|

References

External links
 Sarah Schneider at Invicta FC
 

1986 births
Living people
American women boxers
American female mixed martial artists
Strawweight mixed martial artists
Mixed martial artists utilizing boxing
Mixed martial artists from Missouri
People from Raytown, Missouri
21st-century American women